Piraisoodan (6 February 1956 – 8 October 2021) was a Tamil poet and lyricist.

He won the Tamil Nadu State Film Award for Best Lyricist for his songs in movies like Thayagam, En Rasavin Manasile and Neeyum Naanum in 1996, 1991 and 2010 respectively. He wrote ‘Jagam Pughazum’, a Carnatic song that sums up the life of Thyagaraja.

He was conferred the title "Kavi Nyaani" by the late music director M.S.Viswanathan. He is notable for his eloquent literary speeches and for his ability to complete a song in few minutes. In a television reality program called "Vanampadi" he explained the meaning and intricate nuances of various Tamil film songs that won him accolades and place him as the best analyser and critic for Tamil film songs.

He was conferred a Doctorate in literature by the University Of Jerusalem.

Personal life
Piraisoodan was born and brought up in Nannilam, a small panchayat town in Tiruvarur district in Tamil Nadu. Originally named Chandrasekhar, he took the pseudonym as a Tamil translation of his name. Piraisoodan has nine siblings - seven brothers and two sisters. One of them is R. Madhi, a cinematographer who also works in the Tamil film industry. Piraisoodan has a daughter and son Dhayanandh Piraisoodan, a music director who also works in the film industry. He made his debut as lyricist with Sirai (1985).

Death
He died on 8 October 2021 at the age of 65 due to heart attack.

Partial filmography

Lyricist

Films 
{| class="wikitable sortable"
|-
! Year !! Film !! Songs !! Notes
|-
| 2017 || Jayikkira Kudhira|| Veetukkoru Saamiyundu ||
|-
| 2016 || Aranmanai 2 || Amma (The Amman song) || 
|-
| 2014 || Aranmanai || Unnaye Nambiye ||
|-
| 2013 || Masani|| Masani ||
|-
| rowspan=3|2013 || Ullamellam Talladuthe|| Ullamellam Talladuthe || 
|-
| Chandramouli || Dharmam Vazha & Nallavan Endrum ||
|-
| Arya Surya || Star Star ||
|-
| 2012 || Nachiyarpuram || Nachiyarpuram || 
|- 
| rowspan=2|2011 || Sri Rama Rajyam || All Songs and Dialogues ||
|-
| Om Sakthi || Jolly Aa Jolly Aa, Pongum Kanalai & Yemana Kolluthu ||
|-
| rowspan=2|2009 || Enga Raasi Nalla Raasi || Vaaya Vaaya ||
|-
| Thee|| Theepporiyil ||
|-
| rowspan=2|2008 || Marudhani || ||
|-
| Kodaikanal || All Songs except 'Mettu Mettu ||
|-
| rowspan=4|2007 || Piragu|| Aasa Dosa ||
|-
| Cheena Thaana 001|| Acha Acha ||
|-
| Adavadi|| Idhu One Day & Dindugal Poottu ||
|-
| Manikanda|| Madhippukuriya ||
|-
| rowspan=4|2005 || Aatchi || All Songs ||
|-
| Girivalam|| Adiyae Aandaal Amma ||
|-
|Veeran||all songs||
|-
| Iyer IPS|| Hi-Tech Kangala ||
|-
| rowspan=7|2004 || Manathil || Ponnu Paarthathum ||
|-
| Kadhal Thiruda || Thalukki Nikkara ||
|-
| Maha Nadigan|| Alwa Nayagane ||
|-
| Oru Murai Sollividu'|| Enna Kichu Kichu || 
|-
| Super Da|| Iduppu Madippu ||
|-
| Jore|| Muttikkalama ||
|-
| Adi Thadi || Thagadu Thagadu ||
|-
| rowspan=2|2003 || Unnai Paartha Naal Mudhal || Engu Ullayamma & Naathirinna ||
|-
| Anbe Un Vasam|| Thirumugam ||
|-
| rowspan=3|2002 || Rudhiran || All Songs ||
|-
| Dance Master || All Songs ||
|-
| Jjunction|| Poo Mugam Siricha || 
|-
| rowspan=4|2001 || Star|| Rasiga Rasiga || 
|-
| Super Kudumbam || Yenthen Selaiyum and Uyirae En Uyirai ||
|-
| Krishna Krishna || Aandavan Namaku ||
|-
| Engalukkum Kaalam Varum || Engalukkum Kalam Varum ||
|-
| rowspan=5|2000 || Kurukshetram || Koila Koila and So So So Adi Sonare
|-
| Thenali || Porkalam Ange || 
|-
| Krodham 2|| All Songs ||
|-
| Kandha Kadamba Kathir Vela || Thenatru Meena || Not in Film
|-
| Athey Manithan || All songs
|-
| rowspan=3| 1999 || Sathriya Dharmam || All Songs ||
|-
| Ponvizha|| Adiye Annakiliye & Naadu Sezhikka ||
|-
| Kaadhal || All Songs ||
|-
| rowspan=2| 1998 || Endrum Anandham || Laila Majunu || Not Released
|-
| Autokaran || All Songs ||
|-
| rowspan=6| 1997 || Adhanda Idhanda || All Songs || Not Released
|-
| Putham Puthu Poove || Rettai Jadai || Not Released
|-
| Arasiyal || Varai En Thozhiyae ||
|-
| Thambi Durai || Aathu Mettula ||
|-
| Paththini || Mellathan Solla ||
|-
| Adimai Changili || Kaanangatha Meenu ||
|-
| rowspan=4| 1996 || Krishna|| Idhu Nee Irukkum Nenjamadi & Ingu Aadum Varai || 
|-
| Mouna Yuddham || All Songs ||
|- 
| Puthiya Parasakthi|| Kizhakku Veluchu ||
|-
| Thayagam|| All Songs || Tamil Nadu State Film Award for Best Lyricist
|-
| rowspan=12|1995 || Chinna Ponnu Radha || All Songs || Not Released
|-
| Dear Son Maruthu || Malarodu Nilavu and Poovizhi Vaasalile ||
|-
| Mannai Thottu Kumbidanum || Mannai Thottu Kumbidanum ||
|-
| Varraar Sandiyar || All songs except 'Dindukallu' ||
|-
| Sabash Ramu || All Songs ||
|-
| Asuran|| Chakku Chakku Vathikuchi and O Vanmathi || 
|-
| Anbu Magan || Chinna Chiru ||
|-
| Ellame En Kadhali || All Songs ||
|-
| Lucky Man || All songs ||
|-
| Paattu Vaathiyar || Mutham Endral ||
|-
| Veluchami || Uyire Uyire ||
|-
| Karuppu Nila || Pallakku ||
|-
| rowspan=7| 1994 || Pokkiri Kadhalan || All Songs ||
|-
| Galatta Maappillai || All Songs ||
|-
| Chinna Pulla || All songs ||
|-
| Pandiyanin Rajyathil || Figure Figure ||
|-
| Ilaignar Ani || All songs except 'Kanni Poove Vaa' ||
|-
| Sevvanthi || Punnaivana Poonguyil ||
|-
| Pathavi Pramanam || Ore Oru Paattu and Poo Mudithu Pottu Vachu ||
|-
| rowspan=8| 1993 || Kaaval Thurai || Kanni Ponnu Bossu, Ku Ku Malar Inge and Neeyum Naanum ||
|-
| Parvathi Ennai Paradi || Kadhalil Maatamal and Kombugal Illa ||
|-
| Naan Pesa Ninaipathellam || Devan Kovil ||
|-
| Chinna Devan || Ada Editha Veettu ||
|-
| Aranmanai Kili || Nattu Vecha Roja and Ramera Ninaikkum ||
|-
| Minmini Poochigal || Kanmanikku Nenjil, Ottaga Marangal and Thithikkum Paaru ||
|-
| Chinna Kannamma || Chinna Chinna Poongodi ||
|-
| Sinna Mapplai || Vennilavu Kothipathenna ||
|-
| rowspan=16| 1992 || Veera Marudhu || All Songs ||
|-
| Pudhu Varusham || Chinna Pasanga Paattu, Manasula Manasula and Yaaradi Unpurushan ||
|-
| Onna Irukka Kathukanum || Kadhalunna ||
|-
| Mangala Nayagan || En Kanmani and Poove Ilampoove ||
|-
| David Uncle || Devan Sabaiyinil, Thattungadi and Vaaya Hey Soodu Yeruthu ||
|-
| Endrum Anbudan || Manjal Veyil ||
|-
| Naalaya Seidhi || Manthiram Sonnathu ||
|-
| Nadodi Pattukkaran || Vaanga Vaanga ||
|-
| Unna Nenachen Pattu Padichen || Ennai Thottu and Kanna Un Kannil ||
|-
| Chembaruthi|| Nadandhal Irandadi, Ada Vanjiram and Kadile Thanimayile ||
|-
| Thanga Manasukkaran|| Manikuyil Isaikkuthadi and Maaney Mayanguvatheno || 
|-
| Unnai Vaazhthi Paadugiren || Oru Raagam ||
|-
| Kaaval Geetham || Sokkanukku Vaacha ||
|-
| Pandithurai || Ennai Paarthu and Malaiyitta Ponnu ||
|-
| Ilavarasan || Yaaro Neeyaaro ||
|-
| Amaran|| Vethala Potta, Tring Tring, Vasanthame Arugil Vaa, Paanja Janiyam and Abhyam Krishna || 
|-
| rowspan=11| 1991 || Anbulla Thangachikku || Manja Thanni ||
|-
| Nenjamundu Nermaiundu || Rajave Chinna Rajave ||
|-
| En Pottukku Sonthakkaran || Manasonnu Thudikkuthu ||
|-
| Manasara Vazhthungalen || Nee Sonadhu ||
|-
| Oorellam Un Paattu || Thom Thom || 
|-
| Idhayam|| Idhayamae Idhayamae ||
|-
| Captain Prabhakaran|| Aattama Therottama || 
|-
| En Rasavin Manasile|| Sola Pasunkiliye || Tamil Nadu State Film Award for Best Lyricist
|-
| Gopura Vasalile|| Kadhal Kavithaigal, Keladi En and Naatham || 
|-
| Perum Pulli|| Aanum Pennum and Mambala Thota || 
|-
| Eeramana Rojave|| Kalakalakum Maniosai || 
|-
| rowspan=14| 1990 || Nee Sirithaal Deepavali || Sayangala Sandhya ||
|-
| Raja Kaiya Vacha || Kadhalukku Raja ||
|-
| Vellaiya Thevan || Nall Isai Thattu ||
|-
| Mallu Vetti Minor || Adi Matthalam ||
|-
| Amman Kovil Thiruvizha || Madhura Oyilattam ||
|-
| My Dear Marthandan || Oh Azhagu Nilavu ||
|-
| Keladi Kanmani|| Thendral Thaan ||
|-
| Sirayil Pootha Chinna Malar || Ethanai Per Unnai Nambi ||
|-
| Athisaya Piravi || Thanananthan ||
|-
| Periya Veetu Pannakkaran || Summa Nee ||
|-
| Maruthu Pandi || Adhamum Yevalum ||
|-
| Pondatti Thevai || Amma Naan ||
|-
| Arangetra Velai|| Gundu Onnu || 
|-
| Panakkaran|| Silence Idhu Kadhal || 
|-
| rowspan=11| 1989 || Vaathiyaar Veettu Pillai || Chikkunu Irukku ||
|-
| Mappillai|| Veru Velai Unakku || 
|-
| Anbu Kattalai || Oru Koottin Kiligal ||
|-
| Kai Veesamma Kai Veesu || Nal Anbedhan ||
|-
| Ninaivu Chinnam || Oorellam Thoonguthu ||
|-
| Padicha Pulla || Poongatre Ini Pothum and Poongatre Ithu Pothum ||
|-
| Enga Ooru Mappillai || Oorukulla Vantha ||
|-
| Rajadhi Raja|| Meenamma Meenamma  ||
|-
| En Purushanthaan Enakku Mattumthaan || Pullai Kooda ||
|-
| Pongi Varum Kaveri || Indha Rasave and Mannavan Paadum ||
|-
| Ennai Peththa Rasa|| Sontham Ondrai ||
|-
| rowspan=3| 1988 || Enga Ooru Kavalkaran || Jivvu Jivvu ||
|-
| En Bommukutty Ammavukku || Uyirin Uyire ||
|-
| Irandil Ondru || Naarinil Poo ||
|-
| 1984 || Sirai|| Rasathi Rosapoove || Debut Movie
|}

 Television 
 1995 Vizhuthugal 1999 Mangai 1999 Pallankuzhi 2000 Gopuram 2000 Maya Machindra 2003 Anandham 2006 Agni Pravesam 2008 Rekha IPS 2009 Avalukkendru Oru Manam 2010 Uyirin Niram OodhaDialogue writer
1999 Sathriya Dharmam 2000 Krodham 2 2000 Shankar 2011 Sri Rama Rajyam (Tamil version)

Actor
 1992 Amaran 2014 Sathuranga Vettai 2016 Pugazh2019 Enakku Innum Kalyanam Aagala2021 Annaatthe''

References

External links
 
 

1956 births
2021 deaths
People from Tiruvarur district
Indian lyricists
Tamil film poets
Indian male poets
20th-century Indian poets
Poets from Tamil Nadu
20th-century Indian male writers